Sergei Ivanovich Makeyev (born 24 July 1966) is a former Russian professional footballer.

Club career
He made his professional debut in the Soviet Second League in 1982 for FC Lokomotiv Kaluga.

Honours
 Soviet Cup finalist: 1989.

References

1966 births
Sportspeople from Kaluga
Living people
Soviet footballers
Russian footballers
Association football defenders
Soviet Top League players
Russian Premier League players
FC Torpedo Moscow players
PFC Krylia Sovetov Samara players
FC Tyumen players
FC Lokomotiv Kaluga players
FC Spartak Kostroma players